Jean-Michel Lorain (born 7 January 1959) is a French chef. He is the owner of the restaurant La Côte Saint Jacques located in Joigny, department of Yonne in the region of Bourgogne. With his father Michel Lorain, he was rated 19.5/20 in the Gault et Millau and had three stars at the Guide Michelin from 1986 to 2001 and from 2004 to 2015. He has two Michelin stars since 2015.

Michel Lorain 
His father Michel Lorain was born in 1934, son of Marie Lorain, restaurateur who founded La Côte Saint Jacques in Joigny, Yonne in 1945. Michel Lorain began his training course with a pastry chef and then succeeded to his mother at La Côte Saint Jacques in 1958 with his wife Jacqueline, a wine waiter.

In 1971, Michel Lorain received his first Michelin star and later a second one in 1976. The following year, La Côte Saint Jacques joined the hotel and restaurant network Relais & Châteaux.

Biography
Jean-Michel Lorain was born on 7 January 1959 in Migennes at 8 km of Joigny, the son of Jacqueline and Michel Lorain. He obtained a scientific high school final exam before beginning his training course with the famous brothers Pierre and Jean Troisgros in Roanne in 1977, and later at the famous restaurant Taillevent in Paris with the chef Claude Deligne in 1979.

He then made his military service, joined his father at the family restaurant for one year, and worked with the chef Frédy Girardet at Crissier in Switzerland in 1982 for a year and a half. In 1983, he came back at Joigny to join again his father Michel. He married Brigitte and they have two daughters, Marine and Alexandra.

In 1986, Michel and Jean-Michel Lorain received the grade of 19.5/20 at the Gault et Millau and the third Michelin star. He became at age 27 the youngest chef to have three Michelin stars. In 1993, he was named "Chef of the Year" by Christian Millau with the exceptional grade of 19.5/20. His father finally retired that year.

In 2004, the restaurant La Côte Saint Jacques recovered its third Michelin star lost in 2001 due to important renovations to improve the establishment, and kept it until 2015.

Honours 
 Chevalier of the Legion of Honour

Bibliography 
1987 : La Cuisine une passion de père en fils by Michel and Jean-Michel Lorain, Éditions Robert Laffont
1995 : Desserts en fête by Jean-Michel Lorain, Éditions Nathan (for children)
2000 : Cuisine émotion by Jean Michel Lorain, Éditions Minerva
2006 : Les Collections Lorain : Légumes by Jean-Michel Lorain, Éditions Glénat
2007 : Herbes, salades, et fleurs by Jean-Michel Lorain, Éditions Hachette

See also 
List of Michelin starred restaurants

References

External links 
Official site of the restaurant La Côte Saint-Jacques

1959 births
French chefs
Head chefs of Michelin starred restaurants
People from Yonne
Living people
Chevaliers of the Légion d'honneur